Welcome to Eltingville is an American adult animated comedy pilot created by Evan Dorkin, as an adaptation of his comic book series Eltingville. It premiered in the United States on March 3, 2002, on Cartoon Network's late night programming block, Adult Swim, but was not picked up for a full series.

Welcome to Eltingville takes place in Eltingville, Staten Island, and focuses on the lives of four teenage boys: Bill Dickey, Josh Levy, Pete DiNunzio and Jerry Stokes, all members of "The Eltingville Club", who have shared interests in comic books and science fiction, among other things. In the pilot episode, Bill and Josh enter into a fight over a collectible Boba Fett action figure.

Plot 
The Eltingville Club's members, Bill Dickey, Josh Levy, Pete DiNunzio and Jerry Stokes, all get into a fight while playing Dungeons and Dragons, wake up Bill's mom and Bill kicks Josh out of the club. The next day, Bill awakes from a nightmare which he called a "freaky premonition," and decides to let Josh back into the club. They end their day at a comic book shop, where Bill and Josh compete in a trivia contest to win an action figure of Boba Fett. While Bill technically wins, they continue their dispute, wreaking havoc in the process. They both race home to steal their parents' money, and race back to the store. Meanwhile, Pete and Jerry debate if Boba Fett is still alive after the events of Star Wars Episode VI - Return of the Jedi. Bill and Josh bribe the clerk, Joe, with a check and credit cards, respectively. He denies both forms of currency. They continue arguing and end up breaking the action figure. They need to combine their funds to purchase the broken toy and all four of them are then kicked out of the store. Bill angrily walks away with Fett's head and leaves Josh with the body. While Josh weeps on the ground, Jerry tells Pete, "Well, if Boba Fett wasn't dead before, he sure as hell is now." Willoughby ends the episode by breaking the fourth wall, asking if this is the "end of the Eltingville Club?!"

Production and broadcast 
The pilot episode, "Bring Me the Head of Boba Fett", was written by Evan Dorkin and directed by Chuck Sheetz. It was rated as TV-14 in the United States for comic violence, crude sexual references (including sexualized depictions of women), and moderate offensive language. Production on the episode was officially completed in October 2001 with animation handled by Tama Production in Tokyo, Japan. The pilot was based on Dorkin's time as a comic book store employee at Jim Hanley's Universe in Eltingville, Staten Island. The pilot's story line was partially based upon the comic story of the same name and the pilot's theme opening and closing themes were written and performed by The Aquabats.

Dorkin took a large role in the pilot's creation and has since stated that if he could have re-done the episode, he would have chosen to delegate more work and to choose an Eltingville story that would show off more of the series' potential and characters. If the series had been picked up for further episodes or a miniseries, potential plot lines for episodes would have included a "Klingon vs. Elf war" between a local Klingon camp and a Renaissance fair, as well as the club members digging through the Staten Island landfill for a collectible item that was mistakenly thrown out.

The pilot episode was originally aired in the United States on Cartoon Network's late night programming block Adult Swim on March 3, 2002, and was originally promoted by "special" by Adult Swim. It has since been re-aired periodically on Adult Swim since its original premiere, including twice on Halloween night, October 31, 2008, as part of an advertised "Halloween Stunt" night.

Cast 
 Jason Harris as Bill Dickey, President of the Eltingville Club
 Troy Metcalf as Josh Levy, a member of the club who frequently fights with Bill 
 Larc Spies as Pete DiNunzio, a horror movie addict
 Corey Brill as Jerry Stokes, a fantasy fan and the group's Dungeon Master
 Tara Sands as Jane Dickey, Bill's sister
 Christopher Ward as Ward Willoughby, an unlucky boy
 Glenn Jones as Joe, the owner of a comic book store
 Alicia Sedwick as Mrs. Dickey and Mrs. Levy, the unseen mothers of Bill and Jane Dickey and Josh Levy, respectively
 Evan Dorkin as Ironjaw, a red head with braces who annoys the Eltingville Club with his spit talking

Reception 
Animation World Network and Ain't It Cool News both praised the pilot episode, and Ain't It Cool News complimented the show on its geek humor, which they considered to be fairly accurate and funny.

See also 
 List of television series canceled before airing an episode

References

External links 
 
 The pilot on Adult Swim.com

Staten Island in fiction
Works about fandom
Television pilots not picked up as a series
Nerd culture
Adult Swim pilots and specials
Television shows based on comics
2002 television specials
Anime-influenced Western animated television series
Eltingville, Staten Island